Peeter Kõpp (3 April 1888 Kärstna Parish, Viljandi County – 20 August 1960 Chicago) was an Estonian agronomist, politician and professor. He was a member of Estonian National Assembly.

References

1888 births
1960 deaths
Estonian agronomists
Members of the Estonian National Assembly
University of Königsberg alumni
Academic staff of the University of Tartu
Recipients of the Order of the White Star, 3rd Class
Estonian World War II refugees
Estonian emigrants to the United States
People from Viljandi Parish